Inam-ul-Haq, meaning Gift of the Truth, is a masculine Islamic given name.).

Notable bearers of the name include;

Cricketers 
Inam-ul-Haq (Lahore cricketer) (born 1943), Pakistani cricketer
Enamul Haque (cricketer, born 1966), Bangladeshi cricketer (also known as Enamul Haque Moni)
Inam-ul-Haq (cricketer) (born 1979), Pakistani cricketer
Inam-ul-Haq (Quetta cricketer) (active 1973-74), Pakistani cricketer
Enamul Haque (Sylhet cricketer, born 1986) (born 1986), Bangladeshi cricketer (also known as Enamul Haque Jr)
Anamul Haque (born 1992), Bangladeshi cricketer

Footballers 
Enamul Haque (footballer) (born 1985), Bangladeshi footballer
Anamul Haque Sharif (born 1985), Bangladeshi footballer

Academic 
 Muhammad Enamul Haq (1902–1982), 3rd Vice-Chancellor of Jahangirnagar University.
 Muhammad Enam-Ul Haque (1939–2015), 4th Vice-chancellor of Islamic University, Bangladesh.
 Muhammad Enamul Huq (born 1947),  Bangladeshi politician from Chapai 
 Enamul Haque (born 1994), Bangladeshi Physicist and Materials Scientist

Others
 ARM Inamul Haque (1921–1977), Bangladeshi engineer, veteran and social worker
 Enamul Huq (museologist) (born 1937), Bangladeshi museologist
 Enamul Haque Mostafa Shahid (1938–2016), Bangladeshi politician
 Enamul Huq (born 1938), Inspector-general of police in Bangladesh
 Inamul Haque (scientist) (1940–2014), Indian chemistry lecturer
 Enamul Haque (actor) (1943–2021), Bangladeshi actor and academic
 Enamul Haque Chowdhury (1948–2011), politician in Sylhet District of Bangladesh. Jatiya party ledger and Member of Parliament
 AKM Enamul Haque Shamim (born 1965), Bangladesh Awami League member of Parliament
 Enamul Haque (engineer) (born 1969), Bangladesh Awami League Member of Parliament
 Inaamulhaq (born 1979), Indian actor and screenwriter
 Inam-ul-Haq (diplomat) (born 1940), Pakistani diplomat

References